"Tennessee Flat Top Box" is a song written and recorded by American country music singer Johnny Cash. It was released as a single in late 1961, reaching 11 on the Billboard country singles charts and 84 on the pop charts.  The song's name refers to a steel-stringed acoustic guitar.

Content
The song is a story of a little boy aspiring to be a country singer, who starts his career at a local cabaret in a South Texas border town.  He has no physical abilities, only his ability to play the guitar, which he loves so much that making money is secondary to him.  He becomes so popular that girls "from there to Austin" would secretly leave home and pawn jewelry for money to make the trip to hear him play, and "all the girls from nine to ninety, were snapping fingers, tapping toes, and begging him: 'Don't stop.'"

Ultimately he disappears from the local scene, only to re-emerge on television, having fulfilled his dream.

Charts

Rosanne Cash version

Cash's daughter Rosanne Cash recorded a cover version of "Tennessee Flat Top Box" in 1987 on her album King's Record Shop. Released in November 1987 as the album's third single, it was also the third of four consecutive number-one country hits from that album, peaking in February 1988. Randy Scruggs played the acoustic guitar solos on it.

Rosanne Cash recorded the song at the suggestion of her then-husband, fellow country singer Rodney Crowell. When she recorded the song, she was unaware that her father wrote it, and assumed that it was in the public domain. Johnny later told Rosanne that her success with the song was "one of [his] greatest fulfillments." The Rolling Stone Encyclopedia of Rock & Roll cited Rosanne's cover as a "healing of her strained relationship with her dad." Following her father's death in 2003, Rosanne Cash performed the song during The Johnny Cash Memorial Tribute concert TV special.

Charts

Weekly charts

Year-end charts

Use in video game
A version was made available to download on January 4, 2011, for use in the Rock Band 3 music gaming platform in both basic rhythm, and PRO mode which allows use of a real guitar / bass guitar, and MIDI-compatible electronic drum kits / keyboards in addition to vocals.

References

1961 singles
1987 singles
Johnny Cash songs
Rosanne Cash songs
Songs written by Johnny Cash
Song recordings produced by Rodney Crowell
Columbia Records singles
1961 songs
Songs about country music
Songs about musicians
Songs about guitars
Song recordings produced by Don Law